Damien Arnet Espinosa (born August 23, 1981) is a Cuban professional boxer, whose nickname is "Good Night".

Amateur career
He won a light heavyweight silver medal at the 2000 AIBA Junior World Championships held in Hungary.

Professional career

On August 19, 2006, Norris lost to undefeated Chris Arreola. The bout was televised on HBO.

Professional boxing record

|-
|align="center" colspan=8|16 wins (10 knockouts, 6 decisions), 7 losses (5 knockouts, 2 decisions) 
|-
| align="center" style="border-style: none none solid solid; background: #e3e3e3"|Result
| align="center" style="border-style: none none solid solid; background: #e3e3e3"|Record
| align="center" style="border-style: none none solid solid; background: #e3e3e3"|Opponent
| align="center" style="border-style: none none solid solid; background: #e3e3e3"|Type
| align="center" style="border-style: none none solid solid; background: #e3e3e3"|Round
| align="center" style="border-style: none none solid solid; background: #e3e3e3"|Date
| align="center" style="border-style: none none solid solid; background: #e3e3e3"|Location
| align="center" style="border-style: none none solid solid; background: #e3e3e3"|Notes
|-align=center
|Loss
|
|align=left| Aleksandr Alekseyev
|TKO
|2
|11/06/2011
|align=left| Hamburg, Germany
|align=left|
|-
|Win
|
|align=left| Mathias Reinhardt
|KO
|1
|09/04/2011
|align=left| Ravensburg, Germany
|align=left|
|-
|Win
|
|align=left| Constantin Trifanov
|KO
|2
|20/11/2010
|align=left| Westerburg, Germany
|align=left|
|-
|Win
|
|align=left| Armen Azizian
|TKO
|2
|02/10/2010
|align=left| Kitzbuehel, Austria
|align=left|
|-
|Loss
|
|align=left| Ergin Solmaz
|KO
|2
|28/08/2010
|align=left| Öschelbronn, Germany
|align=left|
|-
|Win
|
|align=left| Nysret Sopaj
|UD
|6
|04/06/2010
|align=left| Hattersheim am Main, Germany
|align=left|
|-
|Win
|
|align=left| Alex Mogylewski
|UD
|8
|07/06/2008
|align=left| Hattersheim am Main, Germany
|align=left|
|-
|Win
|
|align=left| Michael Simms
|SD
|10
|07/02/2008
|align=left| Sacramento, California, U.S.
|align=left|
|-
|Loss
|
|align=left| Malik Scott
|UD
|10
|11/12/2007
|align=left| Miami, Florida, U.S.
|align=left|
|-
|Win
|
|align=left| Alex Gonzales
|SD
|6
|19/10/2007
|align=left| Miami, Florida, U.S.
|align=left|
|-
|Loss
|
|align=left| Jason Gavern
|KO
|7
|22/06/2007
|align=left| Wilmington, California, U.S.
|align=left|
|-
|Loss
|
|align=left| Fres Oquendo
|TKO
|6
|02/05/2007
|align=left| Miami, Florida, U.S.
|align=left|
|-
|Win
|
|align=left| Roderick Willis
|TKO
|3
|17/03/2007
|align=left| Corpus Christi, Texas, U.S.
|align=left|
|-
|Loss
|
|align=left| Chris Arreola
|TKO
|4
|19/08/2006
|align=left| Reno, Nevada, U.S.
|align=left|
|-
|Win
|
|align=left| Jason Gavern
|SD
|6
|28/06/2006
|align=left| San Jose, California, U.S.
|align=left|
|-
|Win
|
|align=left| Joseph Guzman
|KO
|3
|03/02/2006
|align=left| Paradise, Nevada, U.S.
|align=left|
|-
|Win
|
|align=left| Ricardo Arce
|TKO
|2
|10/12/2004
|align=left| Monterrey, Mexico
|align=left|
|-
|Loss
|
|align=left| Ignacio Esparza
|DQ
|7
|24/09/2004
|align=left| Guadalajara, Mexico
|align=left|
|-
|Win
|
|align=left| Iran Rodriguez
|PTS
|6
|14/08/2004
|align=left| Puerto Vallarta, Mexico
|align=left|
|-
|Win
|
|align=left| Jose Luis Garcia
|TKO
|3
|26/06/2004
|align=left| Culiacán, Mexico
|align=left|
|-
|Win
|
|align=left| Victor Maciel
|TKO
|1
|28/05/2004
|align=left| Monterrey, Mexico
|align=left|
|-
|Win
|
|align=left| Jacinto Diaz
|KO
|2
|27/03/2004
|align=left| Tijuana, Mexico
|align=left|
|-
|Win
|
|align=left| Victor Maciel
|TKO
|2
|22/11/2003
|align=left| Tijuana, Mexico
|align=left|
|}

References

External links

Living people
Heavyweight boxers
Cuban emigrants to Germany
1981 births
Cuban male boxers